Wendy Oldfield (born in Cape Town, South Africa) is a South African singer. At the age of nineteen, she formed the rock group The Sweatband, and from 1999 to 2001, she was involved with the band Mondetta.

Career
In 1983, Oldfield was involved in the forming of Sweatband, a South African music group. She was the lead vocalist of the band, and released two albums.
The group's biggest hit was "This Boy" which reached number 15 on the official South African top 20 in September 1986.

In 1988, five years after the formation of the band, she left the group and started her own solo career in the music industry.

Oldfield first rose to fame with the release of her debut album, Beautiful World. This album won her the 1992 Oktave award for Best Female Vocalist. Her song "Miracle" was nominated for Song of the Year.

Her song "Acid Rain" charted twice on South African radio, first in the original studio version and then in an "acid remix".

In 1998, she released her album Duwayo, and was nominated for a First National Bank Producer of the Year award. In 1999 she released the fourth album of her solo career, On a Pale Blue Dot, for which she won the FNB Pop Album of the Year award. She was also nominated for Best Female Vocalist.

For a short while she was involved with the band Mondetta (1999–2001), before releasing her fifth album Holy Water. At the ninth official South African Music Awards she received a nomination for the Best of Adult Contemporary award.

Discography

Albums
1992 – Beautiful World
1996 – Ruby
1998 – Duwayo
1999 – On a Pale Blue Dot
2002 – Holy Water
2009 – Singalong Kidz

Singles
"Living in the Real World" – chart position – No. 1 on 5FM and Capital Radio.

References

External links
 

1964 births
Living people
21st-century South African women singers
Musicians from Cape Town
20th-century South African women singers